Nyssodrysternum rubiginosum is a species of beetle in the family Cerambycidae. It was described by Monne in 1975.

References

Nyssodrysternum
Beetles described in 1975